Lygropia rivulalis, the bog lygropia moth, is a moth of the family Crambidae. It is found in North America, where it has been recorded from Arizona, California, Illinois, Indiana, Iowa, Kentucky, Maine, Maryland, Massachusetts, Michigan, Minnesota, New Hampshire, New Jersey, New York, North Carolina, North Dakota, Ohio, Oklahoma, Ontario, Pennsylvania, Quebec, South Carolina, Tennessee, West Virginia and Wisconsin. The habitat consists of boggy or wet areas.

This wingspan is about 17 mm. The forewing ground colour is pale yellowish or cream with several irregular white patches, surrounded and connected by thick brown lines. The white patch nearest the anal angle is oval or circular and there is a broad white subterminal line which becomes wider near the costa. The distal edge of this line curves down toward the apex just before reaching the costa. The forewing colour and pattern is repeated on the hindwings. Adults are on wing from April to October.

References

Moths described in 1899
Lygropia